M. Athar Tahir (born 1956) is a Pakistani civil servant who is also a poet, author, translator, painter and calligrapher.

Recognition 

He won the National Book Council Prize in 1991.

See also 
 Pakistani poetry
 List of Pakistani writers
 Daud Kamal
 Alamgir Hashmi
 Omer Tarin

References

1956 births
Living people
Pakistani poetry
Alumni of the University of Oxford